Hasan Cemil Çambel (1879–1967) was a Turkish politician and historian, who was a founding member of the Turkish Historical Association, which he also served as its president. He was a close friend of Mustafa Kemal Atatürk and the father of Halet Çambel.

References 

1879 births
1967 deaths
People from Çanakkale
20th-century Turkish politicians
Republican People's Party (Turkey) politicians
20th-century Turkish historians